Camille LaPierre (born February 8, 1951) is a Canadian former professional ice hockey player who played in the World Hockey Association (WHA). He played parts of two WHA seasons for the Philadelphia Blazers and Vancouver Blazers. LaPierre was drafted in the sixth round of the 1971 NHL Amateur Draft by the Los Angeles Kings.

Career statistics

References

External links

1951 births
Canadian ice hockey centres
Ice hockey people from Quebec
Laval Saints players
Living people
Los Angeles Kings draft picks
Montreal Junior Canadiens players
Philadelphia Blazers players
Roanoke Valley Rebels (EHL) players
Roanoke Valley Rebels (SHL) players
Seattle Totems (WHL) players
Sportspeople from Saguenay, Quebec
Springfield Kings players
Tidewater Sharks players
Vancouver Blazers players